Cryptaegis is a genus of air-breathing land snails, terrestrial pulmonate gastropod mollusks in the family Camaenidae.

Species 
Species within the genus Cryptaegis include:
 Cryptaegis pilsbryi Clapp, 1923

References 

 Delsaerdt, A.G.J. (2012). Land snails of the Solomon Islands. Vol. II Camaenidae. Ancona: L'Informatore Piceno. 178 pp., 14 pls

External links
 Clapp, W.F. (1923). Some Mollusca from the Solomon Islands. Bulletin of the Museum of Comparative Zoology, 65 (11): 351-418, 5 pls

Camaenidae
Monotypic gastropod genera